Neocodia is a genus of moths of the family Noctuidae. The genus was described by Schaus in 1911.

Species
Neocodia albidivisa Dognin, 1914 Ecuador
Neocodia asna Schaus, 1911 Costa Rica

References

Acontiinae